Lakeshore Entertainment Group, LLC is an American independent film production, finance, and former international sales and distribution company founded in 1994 by Tom Rosenberg and Ted Tannebaum (1933–2002). Lakeshore Entertainment is headquartered in Beverly Hills, California. The company produced over 60 films, including the Academy Award-winning Million Dollar Baby. Sigurjón Sighvatsson was the company's first president and served from its founding until 1998. He was replaced by producer Gary Lucchesi. The company also had a record label division, Lakeshore Records. In 2013, the company launched a television division, and in 2015, they launched a digital studio, Off the Dock, that targets the YouTube demographic.

Lakeshore Records was the independent music division of Lakeshore Entertainment. They had begun as Will Records, which was founded by Skip Williamson in the early 1990s. As Will Records they released albums by artists such as Grandaddy (starting with their debut A Pretty Mess by This One Band). In 2000, Will Records acquired the catalogue of recently closed Loosegroove Records (a catalogue that included the debut full-length album by Queens of the Stone Age). Will Records and Lakeshore Entertainment partnered to form Lakeshore Records. In 2011, it signed a home video deal with Image Entertainment. In February 2020, it was announced that Lakeshore Records had been sold to Cutting Edge Group.

In March 2019, Lakeshore placed its film library up for sale. The library includes 300 titles, such as the New World Pictures library (which Lakeshore acquired in 1996). In October 2019, Lakeshore sold its library and international operation to Vine Alternative Investments for roughly $200 million. The company was renamed to Lakeshore Village Entertainment, LLC in 2021, a subsidiary of Village Roadshow Entertainment Group distributing content owned by Vine Alternative Investments.

Selected filmography

1990s 
 Bandwagon (1996)
 Box of Moonlight (1996)
 Kids in the Hall: Brain Candy (1996)
 Going All the Way (1997)
 'Til There Was You (1997)
 Murder in Mind (1997)
 The Real Blonde (1997)
 Homegrown (1998)
 Polish Wedding (1998)
 Phoenix (1998)
 200 Cigarettes (1999)
 Runaway Bride (1999)
 Arlington Road (1999)

2000s 
 The Gift (2000)
 Autumn in New York (2000)
 The Next Best Thing (2000)
 Passion of Mind (2000)
 The Mothman Prophecies (2002)
 Bulletproof Monk (2003)
 Underworld (2003)
 The Hunted (2003)
 The Human Stain (2003)
 Purpose (2003)
 Singing Behind Screens (2003)
 Suspect Zero (2004)
 Wicker Park (2004)
 Madhouse (2004)
 The Keys to the House (2004)
 Million Dollar Baby (2004)
 The Cave (2005)
 Undiscovered (2005)
 The Exorcism of Emily Rose (2005)
 Æon Flux (2005)
 Underworld: Evolution (2006)
 She's the Man (2006)
 Half Light (2006)
 Crank (2006)
 The Covenant (2006)
 The Last Kiss (2006)
 The Dead Girl (2006)
 Blood & Chocolate (2007)
 Feast of Love (2007)
 Elegy (2007)
 The Midnight Meat Train (2008)
 Untraceable (2008)
 Henry Poole Is Here (2008)
 Pathology (2008)
 Underworld: Rise of the Lycans (2009)
 Crank: High Voltage (2009)
 The Ugly Truth (2009)
 Gamer (2009)
 Fame (2009)

2010s 
 The Lincoln Lawyer (2011)
 Underworld: Endless War (2011)
 Underworld: Awakening (2012)
 One for the Money (2012)
 Gone (2012)
 Stand Up Guys (2012)
 I, Frankenstein (2014)
 Walk of Shame (2014)
 The Vatican Tapes (2015)
 The Age of Adaline (2015)
 The Boy (2016)
 American Pastoral (2016)
 Underworld: Blood Wars (2016)
 Cover Versions (2018)
 Adrift (2018)
 A-X-L (2018)
 Peppermint (2018)
 The Wedding Year (2019)

2020s 
 Brahms: The Boy II (2020)

Television programs 

 Heathers (Paramount Network) (2018) (co-production with Gyre & Grill Productions and Underground Films)
 Fast Layne (2019) (co-production with Disney Channel)

Lakeshore Records 

 Artists
 Candiria
 College
 DJ Swamp
 Grandaddy
 Thelonious Monster
 Nick Cave and Warren Ellis

 Soundtracks
 The Gift
 Napoleon Dynamite
 Little Miss Sunshine
 Tropic Thunder
 Red Dead Redemption 2
 Drive
 Swiss Army Man
 Moonlight
 Stranger Things
 Mandy
 The Predator
 Missing Link
 Rambo: Last Blood
 We Summon the Darkness
 Epic Movie
 Crank
 The Spiderwick Chronicles
 D.E.B.S.

References

External links 
 

Film production companies of the United States
Mass media companies established in 1994
Mass media companies disestablished in 2019
Companies based in California
Film distributors of the United States
American independent film studios
International sales agents